Statistics of Austrian national league in the 1967–68 season.

Overview
It was contested by 14 teams, and SK Rapid Wien won the championship.

League standings

Results

References
Austria - List of final tables (RSSSF)

Austrian Football Bundesliga seasons
Austria
1967–68 in Austrian football